Martin Peter Stead (born June 1, 1958) is a Canadian cricketer. He played two One Day Internationals for Canada.

External links

1958 births
Living people
Canadian cricketers
Canada One Day International cricketers
Cricketers from British Columbia
Sportspeople from Vancouver